Cadmium oxide is an inorganic compound with the formula CdO. It is one of the main precursors to other cadmium compounds. It crystallizes in a cubic rocksalt lattice like sodium chloride, with octahedral cation and anion centers. It occurs naturally as the rare mineral monteponite. Cadmium oxide can be found as a colorless amorphous powder or as brown or red crystals. Cadmium oxide is an n-type semiconductor with a band gap of 2.18 eV (2.31 eV) at room temperature (298 K).

Production and structure
Since cadmium compounds are often found in association with zinc ores, cadmium oxide is a common by-product of zinc refining. It is produced by burning elemental cadmium in air. Pyrolysis of other cadmium compounds, such as the nitrate or the carbonate, also affords this oxide. When pure, it is red, but CdO is unusual in being available in many differing colours due to its tendency to form defect structures resulting from anion vacancies. Cadmium oxide is prepared commercially by oxidizing cadmium vapor in air.

Uses
Cadmium oxide is used in cadmium plating baths, electrodes for storage batteries, cadmium salts, catalyst, ceramic glazes, phosphors, and nematocide. Major uses for cadmium oxide are as an ingredient for electroplating baths, optoelectronic devices, and in pigments.

Transparent conductor
CdO is used as a transparent conductive material, which was prepared as a transparent conducting film as early as 1907 by Karl Baedeker. Cadmium oxide in the form of thin films has been used in applications such as photodiodes, phototransistors, photovoltaic cells, transparent electrodes, liquid crystal displays, IR detectors, and anti reflection coatings. CdO microparticles undergo bandgap excitation when exposed to UV-A light and is also selective in phenol photodegradation.

Cadmium plating
Most commercial electroplating of cadmium is done by electrodeposition from cyanide baths. These cyanide baths consist of cadmium oxide and sodium cyanide in water, which likely form cadmium cyanide and sodium hydroxide. A typical formula is 32 g/L cadmium oxide and 75 g/L sodium cyanide. The cadmium concentration may vary by as much as 50%. Brighteners are usually added to the bath and the plating is done at room temperature with high purity cadmium anodes.

Reactivity
CdO is a basic oxide and is thus attacked by aqueous acids to give solutions of [Cd(H2O)6]2+. Upon treatment with strong alkaline solutions,  forms.
A thin coat of cadmium oxide forms on the surface of cadmium in moist air at room temperature. Cadmium will oxidize at room temperatures to form CdO. Cadmium vapor and steam will form CdO and hydrogen in a reversible reaction.

References

External links

Cadmium(II) oxide information at Webelements.

Cadmium compounds
Oxides
II-VI semiconductors
IARC Group 1 carcinogens
Rock salt crystal structure